Gwanda District is located in Matabeleland South Province of Zimbabwe. Its administrative seat is Gwanda, the biggest city of the province. 

The center is Gwanda.

 
Districts of Matabeleland South Province